Heather Foord (born 1965) is an Australian television journalist.

Foord was a news presenter for the Nine Network in Brisbane for over 20 years, presenting the weekday edition of Nine News Queensland with Bruce Paige between 1995–2001, and again between 2004–2008. She also presented the weekend news with Mike London between 2001–2004, and then solo between 2009–2011 before retiring from television news in June 2011.

Career
Foord attended Brisbane State High School for her secondary education. After graduating from the University of Queensland, Foord worked with Good Morning Australia at Network Ten before joining Nine News as a reporter. She quickly made the transition to news reader, taking a weekend hosting position after 6 months.

For a duration of three weeks in October 2007, Foord also presented the news bulletins for the Nine Network's Today, an additional duty requiring her to fly between Sydney and Brisbane daily.

While her daughters India, Grace, Riley and Maya were young, Heather returned to the weekend news desk so she could spend more time with her family, but returned to the main desk in 2004 - a position she held until December 2008, when Foord announced her resignation from the news desk after 21 years. Melissa Downes was named her successor in 2009, by which point the strong ratings for Nine News Queensland had worn off.

Foord was announced as the host of Channel Nine Brisbane's Extra in January 2009 replacing Jillian Whiting. Extra was axed in late June, and Foord moved back to Nine News in July as the weekend presenter. She remained in this role before stepping down permanently in June 2011; she was replaced by Eva Milic.

Aside from working on with Channel Nine, Foord is an advocate supporting sufferers of cerebral palsy, a condition which affects her nephew.

References

External links
 Extra Bio
 Article on CP

Nine News presenters
Living people
1965 births
People educated at Brisbane State High School
University of Queensland alumni
Australian women television journalists